Tiit Kuusik (born Dietrich Kuusik; 24 September 1911 Pärnu – 15 August 1990 Tallinn) was a Soviet and Estonian opera singer (baritone).

In 1938 he graduated from the Tallinn Conservatory. 1938–1939 he was a soloist at the Vienna Volksoper, 1942–1943 at the Staatstheater Kassel, and 1944-1988 at the Estonia Theatre.

Several films has been made related to him, including Laulab Tiit Kuusik (1973, Tallinnfilm).

Awards and honors 
 Honored Artist of the Estonian SSR (1945)
 Two Stalin Prizes (1950, 1952)
 People's Artist of the Estonian SSR (1952)
 People's Artist of the USSR (1954)
 Order of Lenin (1956)
 Order of the Badge of Honour (1965)
 Order of the Red Banner of Labour (1971)
 Order of Friendship of Peoples (1981)
 Order of the October Revolution (1986)

Opera roles

 Silvio (Leoncavallo's "Pajatsid", 1938 in Estonia Theatre)
 Escarnillo (Bizet's "Carmen", 1938)
 Tonio (Leoncavallo's "Pajatsid" 1939, 1942, 1946, 1948,1954 and 1978)

References

1911 births
1990 deaths
20th-century Estonian male opera singers
People from Pärnu
People from Kreis Pernau
Academic staff of the Estonian Academy of Music and Theatre
Estonian Academy of Music and Theatre alumni
Members of the Supreme Soviet of the Estonian Soviet Socialist Republic, 1959–1963
People's Artists of the Estonian Soviet Socialist Republic
People's Artists of the USSR
Stalin Prize winners
Recipients of the Order of Friendship of Peoples
Recipients of the Order of Lenin
Recipients of the Order of the Red Banner of Labour
Operatic baritones
Estonian music educators
Soviet male opera singers
Soviet music educators
Burials at Metsakalmistu